Pyrimidine oxygenase (RutA) is an enzyme with systematic name ''). This enzyme catalyses the following chemical reaction

 (1) uracil + FMNH2 + O2  (Z)-3-ureidoacrylate peracid + FMN
 (2) thymine + FMNH2 + O2  (Z)-2-methylureidoacrylate peracid + FMN

In vitro the product (Z)-3-ureidoacrylate peracid is spontaneously reduced to ureidoacrylate.

References

External links 
 

EC 1.14.99